Trnka (feminine Trnková) is a Czech habitational surname, meaning a person who lived by a blackthorn bush, or trnka in Czech. The name may refer to:

 Jaroslav Trnka (born 1983), Czech physicist, one of the authors who introduced amplituhedron
 Jiří Trnka (1912–1969), Czech puppet maker
 Jiří Trnka (footballer) (1926–2005), Czech football player
 Johann Trnka (died 1950), Austrian murderer
 Margareta Trnková-Hanne (born 1976), Czech athlete
 Pavel Trnka (born 1976), Czech ice hockey player
 Věra Trnková (1934–2018), Czech mathematician
 Veronika Trnková (born 1995), Czech volleyball player
 Wenzel Trnka (1739–1791), Bohemian physician

References

Czech-language surnames